Pasangar (also Romanized as Pāsangar and Pā-ye Sangar; also known as Pāy-e Sangar) is a village in Tukahur Rural District, Tukahur District, Minab County, Hormozgan Province, Iran. At the 2006 census, its population was 18, in 4 families.

References 

Populated places in Minab County